Mr. Martian (AKA: CH'kk Kk'xx – Chuck Cox) is a fictional character in Big Bang Comics, who first appeared in Big Bang #21, but didn't receive his own story until World Class Comics #1.

Fictional character biography
CH'kk Kk'xx is a Martian originally sent to investigate planet Earth and see that the Nuclear Age went without disaster. CH'kks' spaceship crashed outside of Roswell after being shot down by the American Air Force, mistaking it for a Communist attack.

CH'kk went underground as Chuck Cox, and soon came to like the Earth, and instead decided to defend it from his own planet.

Powers
Mr. Martian is also exceptionally strong, and gifted with the power of teleportation. He uses a Distorter Beam to alter his appearance, and a Multi-Ray to enlarge or shrink his opponents. However, he cannot breathe Earth's atmosphere, and must always wear a protective helmet.

Mars
Planet Mars was once a paradise, until a nuclear war made the surface uninhabitable. The Martians moved underground, only coming to the surface to use the "Transit Tubes" (which Earth scientists mistook for Martian canals). Under the surface, Martian technology flourished, and continues to do so underneath the planet.

References about science fiction
Besides being a pastiche of Martian Manhunter, there are other references to science-fiction with Mr. Martian.
 The first is The War of the Worlds, as the Martians were attempting to escape their dissipated planet and chose Earth as their new home. Mr. Martian was sent in a scouting party to examine Earth for the possibility of invasion.
 Giovanni Schiaparelli was the first to spot what was thought to be Martian canals (Although Giovanni referred to them as "canali", channels). Percival Lowell also mapped them out, thinking they were formed by intelligent life.
 The Roswell incident of 1947 is another factor. The possibility of a UFO crash restarted the public's interest in alien invasion.

Extraterrestrial superheroes
Image Comics superheroes
Big Bang Comics
Fictional Martians